The Roscosmos Cosmonaut Corps (in Russian: Отряд космонавтов, simply The Cosmonauts Corps) is a unit of the Russia's Roscosmos State Corporation that selects, trains, and provides astronauts as crew members for the Russian Federation and international space missions.  It is part of the Yuri Gagarin Cosmonaut Training Center, based at Star City in Moscow Oblast, Russia.

History
The development of Soviet science and technology made it possible, by the end of the 1950s, to consider the issues of manned space flight. At the beginning of 1959, the President of the USSR Academy of Sciences Mstislav Keldysh held a meeting at which questions about manned space flight were discussed specifically, right down to "who should fly?". The decision on the selection and training of astronauts for the first space flight on the spacecraft "Vostok" was made in the Resolution of the Central Committee of the Communist Party and the Council of Ministers of the USSR No. 22-10 "On the medical selection of candidates for astronauts", dated January 5, 1959, and in the Resolution  Council of Ministers of the USSR No. 569-264 "On the preparation of man for space flights", May 22, 1959.

The selection of candidates for cosmonauts corps was entrusted to the command of the Air Force of the Armed Forces, military doctors and medical flight commissions, which monitored the health of pilots in units and formations, and the training of future cosmonauts was entrusted to the Air Force of the Armed Forces of the USSR. Later, the selection was directly entrusted to a group of specialists from the Central Military Research Aviation Hospital (TsVNIAH). 

The cosmonaut corps was formed on January 11, 1960 by the order of the Commander-in-Chief of the Air Force of the Armed Forces of the USSR, dated March 7, 1960, the first 12 pilots who passed the initial selection were appointed to the post of listener-cosmonauts of the Air Force; The first cosmonaut corps, which included the future first cosmonaut of Yuri Gagarin, consisted of twenty people. On March 23, 1961, Yuri Gagarin was appointed as the commander of the cosmonaut corps.

The first Cosmonauts Corps was military unit No. 26266, which formed with the task of training cosmonauts, and a little later it was transformed into the Cosmonaut Training Center of the Air Force of the Armed Forces.

After the dissolution of the Soviet Union, the Corps became partly civilian and was managed by the Russian Space and Aviation Agency (RKA).

Organization
The cosmonaut Corps is based at the Yuri Gagarin Cosmonaut Training Center in Star City, Russia, although members may be assigned to other locations based on mission requirements.

The Chief of the Cosmonaut Office is the most senior leadership position for active cosmonaut in the Corps. The Chief serves as head of the Corps and is the principal adviser to the Roscosmos Director-General on cosmonaut training and operations. The first Chief Astronaut was Yuri Gagarin, appointed in 1960. The current Chief is Maksim Kharlamov.

Requirements

In order to enter the cosmonaut corps, a candidate for the role of a space pilot must pass medical and psychological tests (in the Central Research Aviation Hospital), as well as undergo a face-to-face interview. During Soviet Union, in addition, membership in the Communist Party of the Soviet Union was also a prerequisite for joining the cosmonaut corps.

The main current requirements for joining the cosmonaut corps are to be with Russian citizenship, age up to 35 years, higher education, knowledge of English, successful passing of medical and psychological tests, body weight up to 90 kilograms.

List of Active Cosmonauts
, the corps has 23 "active" cosmonauts consisting of 1 woman and 22 men or 4.3% female and 95.7% male All of the current astronaut corps were selected in 1996 or later.

List of Former Cosmonauts (partial)

Russia and the Soviet Union 
The Soviet space program came under the control of the Russian Federation in December 1991; the new program, now called the Russian Federal Space Agency, retained continuity of equipment and personnel with the Soviet program. While all Soviet and RKA cosmonauts were born within the borders of the U.S.S.R., many were born outside the boundaries of Russia, and may be claimed by other Soviet successor states as nationals of those states. These cosmonauts are marked with an asterisk * and their place of birth is shown in an appended list. All, however, claimed Soviet or Russian citizenship at the time of their space flights.

A
 Viktor Mikhaylovich Afanasyev —  Soyuz TM-11,  Soyuz TM-18, Soyuz TM-29, Soyuz TM-33/32
 Vladimir Aksyonov —  Soyuz 22, Soyuz T-2
 Aleksandr Pavlovich Aleksandrov —  Soyuz T-9, Soyuz TM-3
 Ivan Anikeyev (1933–1992) —  Expelled from Vostok program; no flights.
 Anatoly Artsebarsky* —  Soyuz TM-12
 Yuri Artyukhin (1930–1998) —  Soyuz 14
 Oleg Atkov —  Soyuz T-10/11
 Toktar Aubakirov* —  Soyuz TM-13/12
 Sergei Avdeyev —  Soyuz TM-15, Soyuz TM-22

B
 Aleksandr Balandin —  Soyuz TM-9
 Yuri Baturin —  Soyuz TM-28/27, Soyuz TM-32/31
 Pavel Belyayev (1925–1970) —  Voskhod 2
 Georgi Beregovoi* (1921–1995) —  Soyuz 3
 Anatoly Berezovoy (1942–2014) —  Soyuz T-5/7
 Valentin Bondarenko (1937–1961) —  No flights.
 Andrei Borisenko —  Soyuz TMA-21
 Nikolai Budarin —  STS-71/Soyuz TM-21, Soyuz TM-27, STS-113/Soyuz TMA-1
 Valery Bykovsky — (1934–2019) —  Vostok 5, Soyuz 22, Soyuz 31/29

D
 Vladimir Dezhurov —  Soyuz TM-21/STS-71
 Georgy Dobrovolsky* (1928–1971), Died on reentry. —  Soyuz 11
 Lev Dyomin (1926–1998) —  Soyuz 15
 Vladimir Dzhanibekov* —  Soyuz 27/26, Soyuz 39, Soyuz T-12, Soyuz T-13

F
 Konstantin Feoktistov (1926–2009) —  Voskhod 1
 Valentin Filatyev (1930–1990) —  Expelled from Vostok program; no flights.
 Anatoly Filipchenko (1928–2022) —  Soyuz 7, Soyuz 16

G
 Yuri Gagarin (1934–1968), First person in space. —  Vostok 1
 Yuri Gidzenko* —  Soyuz TM-22, Soyuz TM-31/STS-102, Soyuz TM-34/Soyuz TM-33
 Yuri Glazkov (1939–2008) —  Soyuz 24
 Viktor Gorbatko (1934–2017) —  Soyuz 7, Soyuz 24, Soyuz 37/36
 Georgi Grechko (1931–2017) —  Soyuz 17, Soyuz 26/27, Soyuz T-14/13
 Aleksei Gubarev (1931–2015) —  Soyuz 17, Soyuz 28

I
 Aleksandr Ivanchenkov —  Soyuz 29/31, Soyuz T-6,
 Anatoli Ivanishin —  Soyuz TMA-22, Soyuz MS-01, Soyuz MS-16,

K
 Aleksandr Kaleri* —  Soyuz TM-14, Soyuz TM-24, Soyuz TM-30, Soyuz TMA-3, Soyuz TMA-01M
 Yevgeny Khrunov (1933–2000) —  Soyuz 5/4
 Leonid Kizim* (1941–2010) —  Soyuz T-3, Soyuz T-10/11, Soyuz T-15
 Pyotr Klimuk* —  Soyuz 13, Soyuz 18, Soyuz 30
 Vladimir Komarov (1927–1967), Died on reentry. —   Voskhod 1, Soyuz 1
 Yelena V. Kondakova —  Soyuz TM-20/STS-84
 Dmitri Kondratyev —  Soyuz TMA-20
 Mikhail Korniyenko —  Soyuz TMA-18, Soyuz TMA-16M
 Valery Korzun —  Soyuz TM-24, STS-111/113
 Oleg Kotov* —  Soyuz TMA-10, Soyuz TMA-17, Soyuz TMA-10M
 Vladimir Kovalyonok* —  Soyuz 25, Soyuz 29/31, Soyuz T-4
 Konstantin Kozeyev —  Soyuz TM-33/32
 Sergei Krikalev —   Soyuz TM-7, Soyuz TM-12/ Soyuz TM-13, STS-60, STS-88, Soyuz TM-31/STS-102, Soyuz TMA-6
 Valeri Kubasov (1935–2014) —  Soyuz 6, Soyuz 19, Soyuz 36/35

L
 Aleksandr Laveykin —  Soyuz TM-2
 Vasili Lazarev (1928–1990) —  Soyuz 12, Soyuz 18a
 Aleksandr Lazutkin —  Soyuz TM-25
 Valentin Lebedev —  Soyuz 13, Soyuz T-5/7
 Alexei Leonov (1934–2019) —  Voskhod 2 (first walk in space), Soyuz 19
 Anatoli Levchenko* (1941–1988) —  Soyuz TM-4/3
 Yuri Lonchakov* —  STS-100, Soyuz TMA-1/TM-34, Soyuz TMA-13
 Vladimir Lyakhov* (1941–2018) —  Soyuz 32/34, Soyuz T-9, Soyuz TM-6/5

M
 Oleg Makarov (1933–2003) —  Soyuz 12, Soyuz 18a, Soyuz 27/26, Soyuz T-3
 Yuri Malenchenko* —  Soyuz TM-19, STS-106, Soyuz TMA-2, Soyuz TMA-11, Soyuz TMA-05M, Soyuz TMA-19M,
 Yury Malyshev (1941–1999) —  Soyuz T-2, Soyuz T-11/10
 Gennadi Manakov (1950–2019) —   Soyuz TM-10,  Soyuz TM-16
 Musa Manarov* —  Soyuz TM-4/6, Soyuz TM-11
 Alexander Misurkin —  Soyuz TMA-08M, Soyuz MS-06, Soyuz MS-20
 Boris Morukov (1950–2015) —  STS-106
 Talgat Musabayev* —  Soyuz TM-19, Soyuz TM-27, Soyuz TM-32/31

N
 Grigori Nelyubov (1934–1966) —  Expelled from Vostok program, no flights.
 Andriyan Nikolayev (1929–2004) —  Vostok 3, Soyuz 9

O
 Yuri Onufrienko* —  Soyuz TM-23, STS-108/111

P

 Gennady Padalka —  Soyuz TM-28, Soyuz TMA-4, Soyuz TMA-14, Soyuz TMA-04M, Soyuz TMA-16M
 Viktor Patsayev* (1933–1971), Died on reentry. —  Soyuz 11
 Aleksandr Poleshchuk —  Soyuz TM-16
 Valeri Polyakov (1942–2022) —  Soyuz TM-6/7,  Soyuz TM-18/20
 Leonid Popov* —  Soyuz 35/37, Soyuz 40, Soyuz T-7/5
 Pavel Popovich* (1930–2009) —  Vostok 4, Soyuz 14

R
 Sergei Revin —  Soyuz TMA-04M
 Roman Romanenko —  Soyuz TMA-15, Soyuz TMA-07M
 Yuri Romanenko —  Soyuz 26/27, Soyuz 38, Soyuz TM-2/3
 Valery Rozhdestvensky (1939–2011) —  Soyuz 23
 Nikolai Rukavishnikov (1932–2002) —  Soyuz 10, Soyuz 16, Soyuz 33
 Sergei Ryazanski —  Soyuz TMA-10M
 Valery Ryumin (1939–2022) —  Soyuz 25, Soyuz 32/34, Soyuz 35/37,  STS-91

S
 Aleksandr Samokutyayev —  Soyuz TMA-21, Soyuz TMA-14M
 Gennadi Sarafanov (1942–2005) —  Soyuz 15
 Viktor Savinykh —  Soyuz T-4, Soyuz T-13/14, Soyuz TM-3,
 Svetlana Savitskaya —  Soyuz T-7/5, Soyuz T-12
 Aleksandr Serebrov (1944–2013) —  Soyuz T-7/5, Soyuz T-8, Soyuz TM-8,   Soyuz TM-17
 Yelena Serova —  Soyuz TMA-14M
 Vitali Sevastyanov (1935–2010) —  Soyuz 9, Soyuz 18
 Yuri Shargin —  Soyuz TMA-5/4
 Salizhan Sharipov* —  STS-89, Soyuz TMA-5
 Vladimir Shatalov* (1927–2021) —  Soyuz 4, Soyuz 8, Soyuz 10
 Anton Shkaplerov —  Soyuz TMA-22, Soyuz TMA-15M
Georgi Shonin* (1935–1997) —  Soyuz 6
 Oleg Skripochka —  Soyuz TMA-01M
 Aleksandr Skvortsov —  Soyuz TMA-18
 Anatoly Solovyev*  —  Soyuz TM-5/4, Soyuz TM-9,  Soyuz TM-15, STS-71/Soyuz TM-21, Soyuz TM-26
 Vladimir Solovyov —  Soyuz T-10/11, Soyuz T-15
 Gennadi Strekalov (1940–2004) —  Soyuz T-3, Soyuz T-8, Soyuz T-11/10, Soyuz TM-10,  Soyuz TM-21/STS-71
 Maksim Surayev —  Soyuz TMA-16, Soyuz TMA-13M

T
 Yevgeni Tarelkin —  Soyuz TMA-06M
 Valentina Tereshkova, First woman in space. —  Vostok 6
 Gherman Titov (1935–2000) —  Vostok 2
 Vladimir Titov —  Soyuz T-8, Soyuz TM-4/6,  STS-63, STS-86
 Valeri Tokarev —  STS-96, Soyuz TMA-7
 Sergei Treshchov —  STS-111/113
 Vasili Tsibliyev* —  Soyuz TM-17, Soyuz TM-25
 Mikhail Tyurin —  STS-105/108, Soyuz TMA-9, Soyuz TMA-11M

U
 Yuri Usachov —  Soyuz TM-18, Soyuz TM-23, STS-101, STS-102/STS-105

V
 Vladimir Vasyutin* (1952–2002) —  Soyuz T-14
 Aleksandr Viktorenko* —  Soyuz TM-3/2, Soyuz TM-8,  Soyuz TM-14, Soyuz TM-20
 Pavel Vinogradov —  Soyuz TM-26, Soyuz TMA-8
 Igor Volk* (1937–2017) —  Soyuz T-12

 Alexander Volkov* —  Soyuz T-14, Soyuz TM-7, Soyuz TM-13,  Soyuz TM-13
 Sergei Aleksandrovich Volkov* —  Soyuz TMA-12, Soyuz TMA-02M
 Vladislav Volkov (1935–1971), Died on reentry. —  Soyuz 7, Soyuz 11
 Boris Volynov —  Soyuz 5, Soyuz 21

 Sergei Vozovikov (1958–1993),drowned during survival training program —  No flights.

Y
 Boris Yegorov (1937–1994) —  Voskhod 1
 Aleksei Yeliseyev —  Soyuz 5/4, Soyuz 8, Soyuz 10
 Fyodor Yurchikhin* —  STS-112, Soyuz TMA-10, Soyuz TMA-19, Soyuz TMA-09M

Z
 Dmitri Zaikin (1932–2013) —  No flights.
 Sergei Zalyotin —  Soyuz TM-30, Soyuz TMA-1/TM-34
 Vitali Zholobov* —  Soyuz 21
 Vyacheslav Zudov —  Soyuz 23

Soviet and Russian cosmonauts born outside Russia
All of the locations below were part of the former U.S.S.R. at the time of the cosmonauts' birth.

Azerbaidzhan S.S.R. / Azerbaijan  

 Musa Manarov, born in Baku, Azerbaijan

Byelorussian S.S.R. / Belarus 

 Pyotr Klimuk, born in Komarovka, Belarus 
 Vladimir Kovalyonok, born in Beloye, Belarus 
 Oleg Novitski, born in Chervyen', Belarus

Georgian S.S.R. / Georgia  

 Fyodor Yurchikhin, born in Batumi, Georgia

Kazakh S.S.R. / Kazakhstan  

 Toktar Aubakirov, born in Karaganda, Kazakhstan 
 Yuri Lonchakov, born in Balkhash, Kazakhstan 
 Talgat Musabayev, born in Kargaly, Kazakhstan 
 Viktor Patsayev, born in Aktyubinsk, Kazakhstan 
Dmitry Petelin — born in Kustanai, Kazakhstan
 Vladimir Shatalov, born in Petropavlovsk, Kazakhstan 
 Aleksandr Viktorenko, born in Olginka, Kazakhstan

Kirghiz S.S.R. / Kyrgyzstan  

 Salizhan Sharipov, born in Uzgen, Kyrgyzstan 
Sergey Korsakov, born in Krunze, Kyrgyzstan

Latvian S.S.R. / Latvia 

 Aleksandr Kaleri, born in Jūrmala, Latvia 
 Anatoly Solovyev, born in Riga, Latvia  
 Oleg Artemyev, born in Riga, Latvia

Turkmen S.S.R. / Turkmenistan 

 Oleg Kononenko, born in Chardzhou, Turkmenistan

Ukrainian S.S.R. / Ukraine 

 Anatoly Artsebarsky, born in Prosyana, Ukraine 
 Georgi Beregovoi, born in Federivka, Ukraine 
 Georgiy Dobrovolskiy, born in Odessa, Ukraine 
 Yuri Gidzenko, born in Yelanets, Ukraine 
 Leonid Kizim, born in Krasnyi Lyman, Ukraine 
 Oleg Kotov, born in Simferopol, Ukraine 
 Anatoli Levchenko, born in Krasnokutsk, Ukraine 
 Vladimir Lyakhov, born in Antratsyt, Ukraine 
 Yuri Malenchenko, born in Svitlovodsk, Ukraine 
 Yuri Onufriyenko, born in Ryasne, Ukraine 
 Leonid Popov, born in Oleksandriia, Ukraine 
 Pavel Popovich, born in Uzyn, Ukraine. 
 Georgi Shonin, born in Rovenky, Ukraine 
 Vasili Tsibliyev, born in Horikhivka, Ukraine 
 Vladimir Vasyutin, born in Kharkiv, Ukraine 
 Igor Volk, born in Zmiiv, Ukraine 
 Aleksandr Volkov, born in Horlivka, Ukraine  
 Sergei Aleksandrovich Volkov, born in Chuhuiv, Ukraine 
 Vitali Zholobov, born in Zburyivka, Ukraine

Uzbek S.S.R. / Uzbekistan 

 Vladimir Dzhanibekov, born in Iskandar, Uzbekistan

See also

 Intercosmos, a Soviet space program designed to give nations on friendly relations with the Soviet Union access to crewed and uncrewed space missions
 Roscosmos, the program's eventual post-Soviet continuation under the Russian Federation
 Pilot-Cosmonaut of the USSR and Pilot-Cosmonaut of the Russian Federation, an honorary titles
 List of Soviet human spaceflight missions
 List of Russian human spaceflight missions

References

External links

Roscosmos
Lists of astronauts
Human spaceflight programs
Russian space program personnel
Crewed space program of Russia